Team University (TU) is a private, co-educational Ugandan university in the Buganda Region of Uganda. It is accredited as a "private university", by the Uganda National Council for Higher Education (UNCHE).

Location
The campus of the university is located in Wood House, at 446 Kabaka Anjagala Road, in Rubaga Division, in Kampala, Uganda's capital and largest city. The geographical coordinates of the campus of Team University are:0°18'21.0"N, 32°33'43.0"E (Latitude:0.305833; Longitude:32.561944).

Overview
In 2001, three Ugandan individuals, namely (a) David Tushabomwe Ndindirize  (b) Joseph Kigongo Balikuddembe and (c) Sam Kindyomunda Rugaba established Team Business College. All three are professional accountants and they began by providing training leading to certification by the Association of Chartered Certified Accountants (ACCA).

In 2006, using experience gained from running TBC, the same trio applied to the UNCHE for permission to establish a private university. On 18 December 2007, UNCHE granted them a Letter of Interim Authority to establish Team University. The University was established in October 2010, as a private "Degree Awarding Institution". In 2015, Team University received full accreditation as a private university.

In October 2017, Team University held its fifth graduation ceremony, graduating nearly 400 degree, diploma and certificate students.
Team university has since grown and is looking at expansion

Academics

Faculties
The university maintains the following academic units as of July 2019.

 Faculty of Business and Management
 Faculty of Computing and Information Technology
 Faulty of Humanities
 The Graduate School
 The Distance Learning Unit.

Academic courses
 Postgraduate degree courses
 Master of Science in Finance
 Master of Business Administration
 Master of Public Administration and Management
 Master of Science in Procurement and Logistics Management
 Master of Science in Human Resource Management

 Undergraduate degree courses
 Bachelor of Science in Accounting and Finance
 Bachelor of Business Administration
 Bachelor of Science in Management
 Bachelor of Procurement and Logistics Management
 Bachelor of Administrative and Secretarial Practice
 Bachelor of Information Technology
 Bachelor of Computer Science
 Bachelor of Public Administration and Management
 Bachelor of Social Work and Social Administration
 Bachelor of Human Resource Management

 Certificate and diploma courses
The university offers certificate and diploma courses at undergraduate and postgraduate levels, in many of the disciplines where degrees are also offered.

See also
Education in Uganda
List of universities in Uganda

References

External links
Website of Team University, Uganda
Fees Structure for Courses Offered at Team University As of 17 August 2017.

Universities and colleges in Uganda
Central Region, Uganda
Buildings and structures in Uganda
Educational institutions established in 2010
2010 establishments in Uganda